Howard Kupperman (April 9, 1931 – February 4, 2014) was an American politician who served in the New Jersey General Assembly from the 2nd Legislative District from 1976 to 1978 and as the Mayor of Longport from 1983 to 1992.

He died on February 4, 2014, in Tarpon Springs, Florida at age 82.

References

1931 births
2014 deaths
Mayors of places in New Jersey
Republican Party members of the New Jersey General Assembly
People from Longport, New Jersey
Politicians from Atlantic City, New Jersey